is a Japanese football player. He played for COEDO KAWAGOE F.C.

Career
Ginji Aki joined J3 League club Blaublitz Akita in 2017.

Club statistics
Updated to 8 December 2019.

Honours
 Blaublitz Akita
 J3 League (1): 2017

References

External links

1994 births
Living people
Association football forwards
Association football people from Chiba Prefecture
Blaublitz Akita players
Crumlin United F.C. players
Expatriate association footballers in the Republic of Ireland
Japanese expatriate sportspeople in Ireland
Japanese footballers
Japanese expatriate footballers
Japan Football League players
ReinMeer Aomori players
Ryutsu Keizai University alumni
J3 League players